The Olef Valley Railway ( or Flitsch) or OTB is a 17.8-kilometre-long, single tracked, unelectrified branch line from Kall through the Schleiden Valley above Schleiden to Hellenthal. The line is currently used by tourists; travelling on the heritage railway in the summer months or occasionally by goods trains. However, there are attempts to reactivate passenger services that were ceased in 1981.

Literature 
 Bernd Franco Hoffmann: Stillgelegte Bahnstrecken im Rheinland. Sutton-Verlag, Erfurt, 2014, .

External links 

 Olef Valley Railway
 Schleiden Valley rail and bus initiative
 Rhein-Sieg Railway
  (pdf; 121 kB)

References 

Eifel
Standard gauge railways in Germany
Railway lines in North Rhine-Westphalia
Euskirchen (district)